Damian Penaud  (born 25 September 1996) is a French professional rugby union player, who plays as a wing or a centre for Top 14 club Clermont and the France national team.

He is the son of former French international, Alain Penaud.

Career
Penaud played for the Clermont Academy side and was selected for the France U20 squad for the 2015 World Rugby Under 20 Championship. He scored 2 tries against the England u20 side. but they lost in the semi-finals to eventual champions, New Zealand. The following year he made the u20 team again for the 2016 World Rugby Under 20 Championship. He only scored one try against Japan in the whole tournament with France finishing 9th.

Penaud made his Top 14 debut in April 2016 against Agen at inside centre. He only played one game that season. He quickly established himself as the backup option for incumbent centre and club legend, Aurélien Rougerie in the following season, regularly playing inside him. He also played 3 games in the 2016–17 European Rugby Champions Cup including the final against Saracens F.C. where he came off the bench to replace Aurélien Rougerie.

Penaud played in the 2016–17 Top 14 Final against RC Toulon helping set up Clermont's only try to Alivereti Raka which helped them win the title.

In 2019 Penaud won the European Rugby Challenge Cup with Clermont in the final against La Rochelle by 36 to 16 with a try in the 30th minute of play.

International career
Penaud was named by France head coach, Guy Novès in a 35-man squad ahead of their three-test series against South Africa.

International tries

Honours

International 
France
Six Nations Championship: 2022
Grand Slam: 2022

Club 
Clermont
Top 14: 2016–17
European Rugby Challenge Cup: 2018–2019

References

External links
 France profile at FFR
 ASM Clermont profile
 
 ItsRugby

1996 births
People from Brive-la-Gaillarde
Living people
French rugby union players
ASM Clermont Auvergne players
Rugby union centres
Sportspeople from Corrèze
France international rugby union players